Sunday Rain is an EP by Seirom, independently released on December 24, 2015.

Track listing

Personnel
Adapted from the Sunday Rain liner notes.
 Maurice de Jong (as Mories) – vocals, instruments, recording, cover art

Release history

References

External links 
 Sunday Rain at Bandcamp

2015 EPs
Seirom albums